Binghamton Railway Company Complex is a historic railway complex located at Binghamton in Broome County, New York.

It was listed on the National Register of Historic Places in 2006.

References

R01
Industrial buildings and structures on the National Register of Historic Places in New York (state)
National Register of Historic Places in Broome County, New York
Transport infrastructure completed in 1893